Barbara Uehling Charlton (June 12, 1932 – January 2, 2020) was an American educator and university administrator. She served as the 3rd chancellor and 17th chief executive officer of the University of Missouri campus in Columbia, Missouri.  She was the first woman in the United States to lead a land-grant university.  Before coming to Missouri, Uehling served as provost for the University of Oklahoma.  After leaving the University of Missouri, she served as a senior visiting fellow on the American Council of Education in Washington D.C. and later served as chancellor of the University of California, Santa Barbara.  Uehling and Rosemary S. J. Schraer were the first women to serve as UC chancellors.

Personal life
Uehling received her undergraduate degree in psychology from Wichita State University in 1954, and a PhD in experimental psychology at Northwestern University. She died from complications of Alzheimer's disease on January 2, 2020.

See also
History of the University of Missouri

References

Leaders of the University of Missouri
People from Columbia, Missouri
University of Oklahoma faculty
University of California, Santa Barbara faculty
Chancellors of the University of California, Santa Barbara
1932 births
2020 deaths